Gilboa may refer to:

Mount Gilboa, a biblical site in Israel, where King Saul's sons were killed by the Philistines, and Saul killed himself (1 Samuel 31:4)
Gilboa Regional Council
Two towns in the United States are named for the mountain:
Gilboa, New York
Gilboa, Ohio
Gilboa Fossil Forest, New York state, USA
The fictional kingdom of Gilboa, in the American TV series Kings
Gilboa (surname)
Gilboa Prison in Israel